Harold (foaled 1876 in Pennsylvania) was an American Thoroughbred racehorse.

Background
Harold was a chestnut horse bred by Aristides Welch who owned both his sire and his dam. Sired by Leamington, a four-time Leading sire in North America, he was out of the mare, Maggie B. B. who produced two other Classic winners: Iroquois, a full brother to Harold who became the first American-bred horse to ever win England's renowned Epsom Derby, plus the colt  Panique by Alarm who won the 1884 Belmont Stakes.

Harold was acquired by the prominent New York stable owner, George L. Lorillard. He entrusted his race conditioning to future U.S. racing Hall of Fame trainer R. W. Walden who would call Harold the best horse he had ever trained

Racing career
Racing at age two, Harold won important races in 1878 and is regarded historically as the American Champion Two-Year-Old Male Horse. At age three, he won the Preakness Stakes, but in the ensuing Withers Stakes he suffered a ruptured blood vessel from which he never fully recovered and won only one more race before being retired to stud.

Stud record
Harold died after serving just one full season at stud.

Pedigree

References

1876 racehorse births
Racehorses bred in Pennsylvania
Racehorses trained in the United States
American Champion racehorses
Preakness Stakes winners
Thoroughbred family 4-m